Shamann Cooke (born July 19, 1982), known professionally as Beat Billionaire, is an American record producer. Cooke grew up in a household with his four brothers in Chippenham Apartments in Southside Richmond, Virginia. He later moved to New York to work with Method Man, Redman, Das Efx, K-Solo, and many more. Parrish Smith introduced Cooke to T.I.'s Grand Hustle knowing that they were a supportive team and would help take his career to the next level.

Grand Hustle to present 
Cooke began as a rapper but after learning music production chose to focus 100% on producing. He took on the name Beat Billionaire and began working with Grand Hustle Records with artists such as T.I., Young Dro, Yung LA, Gucci Mane, and more. Beat Billionaire then signed with Rick Ross' Maybach Music Group. Beat Billionaire has produced records for the entire MMG roster. He is best known for producing the Rick Ross’ 2010 hit "John Doe", Wale's hit single "Bag of Money" and more recently the hit single from the motion picture Suicide Squad, "Purple Lamborghini" which reached number 33 on the charts and number 6 on the hot dance/electronic chart and number 7 on the rap charts and top 100 worldwide. This hit also came with a 2016 Grammy nomination for Beat Billionaire.

Production discography

References

1982 births
Living people
Record producers from Virginia
People from Richmond, Virginia